Boalia is a thana of metropolitan Rajshahi in Rajshahi Division, Bangladesh.

Geography
It has 51063 households and a total area of  96.68 km2.

Demographics
According to 2011 Bangladesh census, Boalia had a population of 221,163. Males constituted 51.73% of the population and females 48.27%. Muslims formed 93.21% of the population, Hindus 6.59%, Christians 0.18% and others 0.02%. Boalia had a literacy rate of 76.37% for the population 7 years and above.

In 1991, Boalia had a population of 294,056. Males constituted 52.53% of the population and females 47.47%. This upazila's eighteen up population was 165,335. Boalia had an average literacy rate of 58.3% (7+ years), and the national average of 32.4% literate.

Administration
Boalia Thana has 30 unions/wards and 82 mauzas/mahallas.

Education

There are 13 colleges in the thana: Alhaj Sujauddula College, Bangabandhu Degree College, Barendra College, Madar Bux Home Economics College, Mahanagar Mahabiddyalaya, Rajshahi College, Rajshahi Government City College, Rajshahi Government Women's College, Shah Mokhdum College, Shahid A.H.M. Kamaruzzaman Govt. Degree College, Upashahar Womans College, Waymark Ideal College, and Wisdom Standard College.

According to Banglapedia, Government P. N. Girls' High School, founded in 1886, is a notable secondary school.

See also
 Upazilas of Bangladesh
 Districts of Bangladesh
 Divisions of Bangladesh

References

Thanas of Rajshahi District
Upazilas of Rajshahi District